Automeris duchartrei is a moth of the family Saturniidae first described by Eugène Louis Bouvier in 1936. It is found in Ecuador, Bolivia and Peru.

The wingspan is 70–80 mm.

References

Moths described in 1936
Hemileucinae
Moths of South America
Taxa named by Eugène Louis Bouvier